Vincenzi is a surname. Notable people with the surname include:

Tommaso Vincenzi (died 1478), Italian Roman Catholic Bishop of Pesaro (1475–1478) and Bishop of Terni (1472–1475)
Giacomo Vincenzi (died 1619), Italian bookseller and music printer from Venice, also known as Giacomo Vincenti

Alfredo Ciriaco De Vincenzi (1907–date of death unknown), Italian Argentine professional football player
Francesco Vincenzi (born 1956), Italian footballer and manager
Giorgio De Vincenzi (1884–1965), Italian painter and etcher
Giovanni Vincenzi (1905–1970), Italian footballer
Guido Vincenzi (1932–1997), Italian footballer
Marta Vincenzi (born 1947), Italian politician
Penny Vincenzi (1939-2018), British novelist